All in Love Is Fair is a studio album by American singer Nancy Wilson, released by Capitol Records in August 1974. It was her first album with producer Gene Page, who also did the arrangements and conducting and gave the album a more R&B-oriented sound. Musicians on the album include Ray Parker Jr., Wah Wah Watson, and Tom Scott. Marvin Gaye is also listed on the back cover as "The Phantom," with "warmest thanks." All in Love Is Fair includes one of the few songs co-written by Wilson.

Jason Ankeny at AllMusic hails Wilson's "sultriness and soulfulness. Page swaddles the singer in billowing strings and slow-burn funk rhythms, weaving a series of luminously sensual backdrops that wouldn't be out of place on Motown or Philadelphia International." He also notes that "the music never veers so far into the mainstream that Wilson abandons her jazz roots entirely, and she brings to the songs the intelligence and articulateness one would expect."

All in Love Is Fair peaked at No. 11 on Billboard's Soul LPs chart and No. 97 on the Billboard 200. The song "Streetrunner" reached No. 46 on Billboard's Best Selling Soul Singles.

In 2011, SoulMusic Records released a digitally remastered version of the album, paired with Come Get to This, Wilson's next album, which was also produced by Gene Page.

Track listing

Side 1 

 "You're Right as Rain" (Linda Creed, Thom Bell) – 3:04
 "Try It, You'll Like It" (Johnny "Guitar" Watson) – 4:46
 "There'll Always Be Forever" ( Dee Ervin, DeeDee McNeil) – 3:00
 "All in Love Is Fair" (Stevie Wonder) – 4:03
 "Streetrunner" (Billy Page, Gene Page) – 3:22

Side 2 

 "Ocean of Love" (Ray Parker Jr.) – 3:06
 "To Make It Easier on You" (Jimmy Webb) – 4:14
 "Tell the Truth" (Nancy Wilson, Tennyson Stevens) – 3:23
 "My Love" (Paul McCartney) – 3:38

Personnel 
From the original liner notes:

 Nancy Wilson – vocals
 Larry Muhoberac – keyboards
 Michel Rubini – keyboards
 Sylvester Rivers – keyboards, rhythm charts
 Ray Parker Jr. – guitar
 David Cohen – guitar
 David T. Walker – guitar
 Wah Wah Watson – guitar
 Scott Edwards – bass
 Eddie Greene – drums
 Joe Clayton – congas
 Gary Coleman – percussionist
 George Bohanon – trombone soloist
 Gene Cirpiano – English horn soloist
 Tom Scott – flute, tenor saxophone, soprano saxophone

Technical personnel
 Gene Page – producer, arranger, conductor
 Billy Page – associate producer
 Larkin Arnold – executive producer
 David Hassinger – recording engineer
 Roy Kohara – art director

References 

1974 albums
Nancy Wilson (jazz singer) albums